Stefan Marković (26 July 1804 – 29 November 1864) was a Serbian politician.

Biography
Marković was born in Zemun and finished elementary school in the town in 1815, and high school in Sremski Karlovci in 1821. He studied at a university in Austria, and in 1834 he moved to Serbia. 

In 1834 he came to live in Kragujevac, then the capital of Serbia. He was a member of the government and the secretary of the Prime Minister's Office from 1835; director of the Prince's Office from 28 September 1837; principal secretary of the Privy Council from 1839; member of the council from 1842 to 1857; minister of justice and minister of education from 21 December 1854 to 29 May 1856; acting minister for foreign affairs from 29 May to 16 September 1856; minister of justice and education from 16 September 1856 to 19 June 1857; and again minister for foreign affairs from 19 June 1857 to 31 March 1858.

Marković was nominated the first member of the Društvo srbske slovesnosti (Society Of Serbian Letters: forerunner of the Serbian Royal Academy) on 27 May 1842; he also held the post of the president of the Society (DSS) from 27 December 1854 until 19 June 1857.

With the return to power of Prince Miloš Obrenović, Marković, knowing that his political career was over, left the country in 1858 never to return.

Stefan Marković died in Vienna in 1864.

References

See also
List of prime ministers of Serbia

1804 births
1864 deaths
People from Zemun
Prime Ministers of Serbia
Politicians from Belgrade
Foreign ministers of Serbia
Education ministers of Serbia
Justice ministers of Serbia